Sissel Solbjørg Bjugn (28 October 1947 – 14 July 2011) was a Norwegian poet and children's writer.

She was born in Bardu. She made her literary début in 1978 with the book Den første avisa på Lofotveggen, for which she was awarded the Tarjei Vesaas' debutantpris. Her children's book Jente i bitar from 1992 was awarded the Brage Prize.

References

1947 births
2011 deaths
People from Bardu
People from Bodø
20th-century Norwegian poets
Norwegian children's writers
Norwegian women poets
Norwegian women children's writers
20th-century Norwegian women writers